Aphelia plagiferana is a species of moth of the family Tortricidae. It is found in Mongolia.

References

Moths described in 1916
Aphelia (moth)
Moths of Asia